The eighth season of British science fiction television series Doctor Who began on 2 January 1971 with Terror of the Autons and ended with The Dæmons featuring Jon Pertwee as the Third Doctor. This is the second of five series which Barry Letts produced consecutively and Terrance Dicks was the script editor.

Casting

Main cast 
 Jon Pertwee as the Third Doctor
 Katy Manning as Jo Grant

Jon Pertwee continues his role as the Third Doctor.  Katy Manning makes her first appearance as companion Jo Grant in Terror of the Autons.

Recurring cast
 Nicholas Courtney as Brigadier Lethbridge-Stewart
 John Levene as Sergeant Benton
 Richard Franklin as Mike Yates
 Roger Delgado as The Master

Nicholas Courtney and John Levene continue their roles of Brigadier Lethbridge-Stewart and Sergeant Benton, while Richard Franklin makes his first appearance as Captain Mike Yates. 

Roger Delgado makes his first appearance as The Master in Terror of the Autons and continues to make appearances in each of the five serials.

Guest stars
Fernanda Marlowe makes appearances in The Mind of Evil and The Claws of Axos as Corporal Bell.

Serials 

The season marks the first appearance of the Master who goes on to make further appearances through the season in every serial as the main antagonist who is finally captured at the end of the season. Colony in Space was the first serial set away from Earth since The War Games at the end of Season 6, and came about as a result of producer Barry Letts' feeling that the Earthbound stories of the Doctor's exile were too limiting in terms of potential plotting.

Broadcast
The entire season was broadcast from 2 January to 19 June 1971.

Home media

VHS releases

DVD and Blu-ray releases

In print

Tie-In Comics 
During the release of the season, several comics were published to tie in to the events of the season. The Kingdom Builders (Set before the events of the season) was published in TV Comic magazine. Gemini Plan, Timebenders (Set after the events of the season) & The Vogan Slaves (Set years into The Doctor's future) were published in Countdown magazine.

References

Bibliography

 

1971 British television seasons
Season 08
Season 08
8